Hispaniasaurus is a genus of extinct marine reptiles with nothosauroid affinities. It lived during the Middle Triassic (Ladinian) in Spain. The type species, Hispaniasaurus cranioelongatus, was named in 2017. The holotype specimen, part of a cranium was found in the Cañete Formation.

References

Nothosauroids
Fossil taxa described in 2017